The IS-4 was a high performance glider designed by Iosif Şilimon and built in Romania in the late 1950s at the URMV-3 (Rom: Uzinele de Reparatii Material Volant-3 - Glider repair and manufacture factory) factory at Braşov.

Design and development
The IS-4 high-performance glider followed the layout of the earlier IS-3d, constructed largely of wood with plywood and fabric skinning. The high-set cantilever wings with moderate dihedral (2º 30') were built with a single main spar with a plywood covered leading edge torsion box. The ovoid section fuselage was of monocoque construction with plywood skin with a streamlined full-length cockpit canopy forward of the wings. The undercarriage consisted of a balloon main-wheel with nose and tail skids. Flying controls were largely conventional with plywood skinned fixed portions and fabric covered wooden built up movable surfaces. Pitch trim was achieved by a trim tab on the elevators and adverse yaw was alleviated through the use of differential ailerons.

Very little is known of the IS-4s development or operational history.

Specifications (IS-4)

See also

Notes

References

1950s Romanian sailplanes
Glider aircraft